Elgg Castle is a castle in the municipality of Elgg in the Swiss canton of Zurich.  It is a Swiss heritage site of national significance.

See also
 List of castles in Switzerland

References

External links
 

Cultural property of national significance in the canton of Zürich
Castles in the canton of Zürich